Stephen Faulder Lawson (born 11 December 1957) is a former speedway rider from England.

Speedway career 
Lawson rode in the top two tiers of British Speedway from 1974 to 1992, riding for various clubs. Lawson was one of the leading National League riders and topped the league averages during the 1984 National League season, in addition to finishing in the top ten averages in 1980, 1981, 1982, 1983 and 1985.

References 

Living people
1957 births
British speedway riders
Belle Vue Aces riders
Birmingham Brummies riders
Cradley Heathens riders
Glasgow Tigers riders
Swindon Robins riders
Workington Comets riders